"Se Acabo (It's Over)" is the second and final single from A Musical Massacre, a 1999 album by East Coast hip hop group The Beatnuts. It was released by Relativity Records in 1999 as a promo 12 inch and CD single. The song is produced by The Beatnuts and features Spanish raps by Juju, Psycho Les and two Merengue rappers: Swinger and Magic Juan. The track's slow-paced Latin beat samples "Se Acabo" by Marco Antonio Muñiz. An English remix of "Se Acabo" featuring Method Man can be found on The Beatnuts' 2001 album Take It or Squeeze It.

Neither the original version of "Se Acabo", nor its remix, charted or received music videos. The remix is nonetheless featured on two Beatnuts hits compilations: Beatnuts Forever and Classic Nuts, Vol. 1.

In 2022, public interest in the Remix version of the song grew, largely thanks to online video-sharing websites such as TikTok. This resulted in the song making its international chart debut in Hungary, peaking at #31.

Single track list

CD single
 "Se Acabo (Clean)"
 "Se Acabo (Instrumental)"
 "Se Acabo (Dirty)"

12" vinyl

A-Side
 "Se Acabo (Clean)"
 "Se Acabo (Instrumental)"
 "Se Acabo (Remix)"

B-Side
 "Se Acabo (Dirty)"

Charts

The Beatnuts songs
1999 singles
1999 songs
Relativity Records singles